Ziem is a surname. Notable people with the surname include:

Félix Ziem (1821–1911), French painter
Steve Ziem (born 1961), American baseball player

See also
Ziemke
Zim (disambiguation)